The Found FBA-1 was a 1940s Canadian four-seat cabin monoplane produced by Found Brothers Aviation.

Design and development
Found Brothers Aviation was formed in 1946 to produce a new design by Captain S.R. Found, the Found FBA-1A. The FBA-1 was a high-wing monoplane powered by a 140 hp (104 kW) de Havilland Gipsy Major engine, designed from its inception to be operated on wheels, tundra tires, skis and on floats. 

The aircraft first flew on 13 July 1949. It was later developed into an all-metal four/five seater the Found FBA-2.

Specifications (FBA-1A)

References

Citations

Bibliography
 Bridgman, Leonard. Jane's All The World's Aircraft 1951–52. London: Sampson Low, Marston & Company, Ltd, 1951.
 The Illustrated Encyclopedia of Aircraft (Part Work 1982-1985). London: Orbis Publishing.

1940s Canadian civil utility aircraft
High-wing aircraft
Aircraft first flown in 1949